Fabrício Eduardo Souza (born 4 January 1980) is a Brazilian footballer who currently plays for Rio Verde.

Club career
Fabrício Souza previously played for Portuguesa, América-MG and Atlético-PR in the Campeonato Brasileiro Série A and Al-Khor in the Qatari League. In July 2009, he moved to K-League side Seongnam Ilhwa Chunma

He returned Brazil after his contract with Seongnam was done. He signed a contract with Sport Recife in 2010.

References

External links
Goalzz.com Player Profile
Marcosul.com Player Profile 

1980 births
Living people
Brazilian footballers
Brazilian expatriate footballers
Associação Portuguesa de Desportos players
América Futebol Clube (MG) players
Club Athletico Paranaense players
Sport Club do Recife players
Guarani FC players
Expatriate footballers in Qatar
Brazilian expatriate sportspeople in South Korea
Seongnam FC players
K League 1 players
Expatriate footballers in South Korea
Al-Khor SC players
Umm Salal SC players
Qatar Stars League players
Association football midfielders